Patacamaya or Patak Amaya (Aymara) is a city in Bolivia, situated in the La Paz Department. It is the seat of the Patacamaya Municipality, the fifth municipal section of the Aroma Province. Patacamaya lies in the Altiplano, approximately 100 km southeast of La Paz. It contains the intersection between 'Carretera 1' which goes from La Paz to Oruro, as well as Cochabamba, and the 'Carretera Arica-La Paz'. The 'Tambo Quemado' highway is one of the most important international roads that travels through Bolivia.

Name 
The name of the city originated from a war that occurred in the 1920s between Aymaras and Quechuas. The word Patakamaya is a conglomeration of two words; pataka meaning "100" and amaya meaning "dead", referring to the casualties of the war.

Observatory 
Situated 3789 meters above sea level, Patacamaya is a prime location for astronomical observation. Its lightly populated area keeps light pollution at a minimum, making it an ideal place for an observatory. The 'Observatorio de Patacamaya' was built in 1973 with help of the Soviets. However, since 1983, the UMSA (Universidad Mayor de San Andres) has been maintaining the observatory.

The telescope in the observatory is a Celestron telescope of 40 cm diameter. The observatory also contains two astro-cameras an AFU-75, and CCD SBIG ST-5 among other astronomical equipment. This equipment has been extremely useful for students researching such events as the passing of Halley's Comet and the Shoemaker Levy 9 Comet.

Economy 
Apart from the Observatory, Patacamaya has some other smaller sources of income including a weekly Sunday fair. Agriculture in the area consists mainly of potatoes.

Patacamaya is also home to the military unit 'Batallon de Tanques I Calama.'

References 

 www.ine.gov.bo

Populated places in La Paz Department (Bolivia)